Cordova Municipal Airport  is a state-owned public-use airport located one nautical mile (1.8 km) east of the central business district of Cordova, a city in the Valdez-Cordova Census Area of the U.S. state of Alaska. It is located on Eyak Lake on which it also has a landing area for seaplanes.

Cordova is also served by the Merle K. (Mudhole) Smith Airport which offers scheduled commercial flights including Alaska Airlines jet service.

Formerly, the airport operated as Cordova Army Airfield.

Facilities and aircraft 
Cordova Municipal Airport has one runway (6/24) with a 1,800 by 60 ft (549 x 18 m) gravel surface. It also has one seaplane landing area (9W/27W) measuring 8,000 by 3,000 ft (2,438 x 914 m). For the 12-month period ending December 31, 2005, the airport had 8,800 aircraft operations, an average of 24 per day: 60% general aviation and 40% air taxi.

References

External links
 FAA Alaska airport diagram (GIF)
 
 
 

Airports in Chugach Census Area, Alaska
Cordova, Alaska
Seaplane bases in Alaska